Jody A. Merritt (born ) is a United States Air Force brigadier general serving as the mobilization assistant to the commander of the Space Operations Command. Prior to that, she was the mobilization assistant to the commander of the Space and Missile Systems Center.

In January 2023, Merritt was nominated for promotion to major general.

References

External links
 

|-

Living people
Year of birth missing (living people)
Place of birth missing (living people)
United States Air Force generals
Major generals